Semiha is a Turkish female given name and may refer to:

Given name
 Semiha Berksoy (1910–2004), Turkish opera singer
 Semiha Borovac (born 1955), former mayor of Sarajevo
 Semiha Es (1912– 2012), the first Turkish female war photographer
 Semiha Mutlu (born 1987), a Turkish racewalker
 Semiha Yankı (born 1958), Turkish pop music singer, presenter  and film actress

See also
 Semikhah

Turkish feminine given names